The Council of Seleucia-Ctesiphon, also called the Council of Mar Isaac, met in AD 410 in Seleucia-Ctesiphon, the capital of the Persian Sassanid Empire. Convoked by King Yazdegerd I (399–421), it organized the Christians of his empire into a single structured Church, which became known as the Church of the East. It is often compared to Constantine's Edict of Milan, approximately a century earlier.

Previously, the Persian state persecuted those Christians, fearing that their loyalty lay with the Roman Empire, which under Constantine the Great had legalized Christianity and with which the Sassanid Empire was repeatedly at war. Persecution had been most severe under Shapur II (309–379). Shapur I (241–272), the second shahinshah (king of kings) of the Sasanian dynasty had advanced as far as Antioch in 260, and both he and Shapur II deported eastward much of the population of the invaded territories to strengthen the Persian economy.

Yazdegerd I adopted a policy of engagement with the Roman Emperor in Constantinople and with the Christian minority in his own empire. In 409, he allowed the Christians to worship openly and to have churches. Zoroastrianism continued to be the official religion, and apostasy from it was punishable by death.

At the suggestion of a bishop from the Roman side of the frontier, he called a synod or council of bishops to organize the Persian Christians as a single Church, with a single bishop in each diocese and with one bishop to act as their head collectively throughout his empire.

See Maruthas of Martyropolis

Establishment of the Church of the East 

The Council, presided over by Mar Isaac, bishop of Seleucia-Ctesiphon, arranged the Persian Church in ecclesiastical provinces, with the bishops in each province grouped around a metropolitan, the arrangement approved by the First Council of Nicea (325) in the civil provinces of the Roman Empire.

The bishop of Seleucia-Ctesiphon, the capital city, who is referred to in the acts of the council as the Grand Metropolitan, was to hold authority throughout the Church and for that reason was called (probably only from a later date) the Catholicos.

The 410 council set up six provinces, which became known as the interior provinces, according as other provinces, referred to as exterior provinces, were recognized further afield within the empire and even beyond it.

In order of precedence, the six interior provinces were:
 Seleucia-Ctesiphon, in what is now central Iraq 
 Beth Lapat, in western Iran
 Nisibis, on the border between today's Turkey and Iraq
 Prat de Maishan, Basra, southern Iraq
 Arbela, Erbil, Kurdistan region of Iraq
 Karka de Beth Slokh, Kirkuk, northeastern Iraq

The council marked a major milestone in the history of the Church of the East and of Christianity in Asia in general.

Uncertain early example of the Filioque

The synod also declared its adherence to the decisions of the First Council of Nicaea and adopted a form of the Nicene Creed. The creed is found in two different recensions, each of which is recorded in much later manuscripts. The first recension is East Syriac and comes from Church of the East sources. The second is West Syriac and comes from Syriac Orthodox sources.  The East Syriac recension contains: "And in the Holy Spirit" while the West Syriac recension contains: "And we confess the living and Holy Spirit, the living Paraclete, who is from the Father and the Son". There has long been controversy among scholars about the relation between the two texts. The development of the Persian creed is difficult to trace, since there were several recensions prior to 410. The first recension is textually closer to the original Nicene Creed. On the other hand, some scholars claim that the second represents the original text of the Seleucia-Ctesiphon Council, and that the words "who is from the Father and the Son" in the second recension are the earliest example of the Filioque clause.

See also
Catholicos
Dioceses of the Church of the East to 1318
List of patriarchs of the Church of the East
Patriarchs of the Church of the East
Synod of Beth Lapat
Syriac Christianity

References

Sources 
 
 
 
 
 
 
  
 

Christianity in the Sasanian Empire
Seleucia-Ctesiphon
5th century in Iran
Church of the East
Eastern Christianity in Iraq
Babylonia
410
Ctesiphon